Madhavi known by her screen name Varsha is an Indian actress who works predominantly in Telugu. She is popular for playing sister roles and in supporting roles to lead actors in many of her movies. She has also acted in a few television serials.

Early life and career
Madhavi was born and brought up in Hyderabad. She made her on screen debut as a child artist in the movie Panjaram in the year 1997. After completing her education she made a come back as a character artist in 1998 with the movie Khaidi Garu. She appeared as one of the lead actresses in movie Nuvve Kavali opposite Tarun and was praised for her performance. She shared her screen with many prominent Telugu actors notably Venkatesh, Nagarjuna, Mohan Babu, Rajasekhar, Tarun, Srikanth, Pawan Kalyan, Jagapathi Babu, Ravi Teja, Jr. NTR and many other actors.

Filmography

Television career 
 Kurukshetram
 Missama
 Logili
 Toli Prema
 Sundarakanda
 Manasu Mamatha
 Attarintiki Daredi
  Kasthuri
 Mattigajulu
 Malli

References

External links 
 

Year of birth missing (living people)
Living people
Actresses from Hyderabad, India
Actresses in Telugu cinema
Child actresses in Telugu cinema
Indian film actresses